The 1964 New York Yankees season was the 62nd season for the Yankees. The team finished with a record of 99–63, winning their 29th pennant, finishing 1 game ahead of the Chicago White Sox. New York was managed by Yogi Berra. The Yankees played at Yankee Stadium. In the World Series, they were defeated by the St. Louis Cardinals in 7 games. It would also be their last postseason appearance until 1976.

Yogi Berra, taking over as manager from Ralph Houk, who in turn moved up to general manager, had a difficult early season, with many veterans missing games due to injury. Doubts about his ability to manage his former teammates were brought into the open with the Harmonica Incident in late August, in which he clashed with utility infielder Phil Linz on the team bus following a sweep by the Chicago White Sox that appeared to have removed the Yankees from pennant contention. The team rallied behind Berra afterwards, and won the pennant. However the incident may have convinced the team's executives to replace Berra with Johnny Keane, manager of the victorious Cardinals, after the season.

This season is considered to be the endpoint of the "Old Yankees" dynasty that had begun with the Ruppert–Huston partnership and then continued with the Topping–Webb partnership. The Yankees would soon undergo ownership changes and front office turmoil, and would not be a serious factor in the pennant chase again until the mid-1970s. For television viewers and radio listeners, the sudden removal of Mel Allen following that season marked the end of an era of Yankees television and radio broadcasts.

Offseason
 November 30, 1963: Marshall Bridges was purchased from the Yankees by the Washington Senators.

Regular season
On September 26, Mel Stottlemyre went 5 for 5, drove in two runs, and threw a two-hit shutout.

Season standings

Record vs. opponents

Notable transactions
 September 5, 1964: The Yankees traded players to be named later and $75,000 to the Cleveland Indians for Pedro Ramos. The Yankees completed the trade by sending Ralph Terry to the Indians on October 21 and Bud Daley to the Indians on November 27.

Roster

Player stats

Batting

Starters by position
Note: Pos = Position; G = Games played; AB = At bats; H = Hits; Avg. = Batting average; HR = Home runs; RBI = Runs batted in

Other batters
Note: G = Games played; AB = At bats; H = Hits; Avg. = Batting average; HR = Home runs; RBI = Runs batted in

Pitching

Starting pitchers
Note: G = Games pitched; IP = Innings pitched; W = Wins; L = Losses; ERA = Earned run average; SO = Strikeouts

Other pitchers
Note: G = Games pitched; IP = Innings pitched; W = Wins; L = Losses; ERA = Earned run average; SO = Strikeouts

Relief pitchers
Note: G = Games pitched; W = Wins; L = Losses; SV = Saves; ERA = Earned run average; SO = Strikeouts

1964 World Series 

With this 4–3 World Series victory, the Cardinals gained a 3–2 edge in overall Series wins over the Yankees, the first time any team had an overall edge against the Yankees since the 1920s. As of 2022, the Cardinals remain the only one of the "classic eight" National League teams to hold an edge over the Yankees.

Awards and honors
 Elston Howard, Gold Glove
1964 MLB All-Star Game
 Whitey Ford, All-Star Game
 Elston Howard, All-Star Game
 Mickey Mantle, All-Star Game
 Joe Pepitone, All-Star Game
 Bobby Richardson, All-Star Game

Farm system

LEAGUE CHAMPIONS: Fort Lauderdale, Johnson City

Notes

References
1964 New York Yankees at Baseball Reference
1964 World Series
1964 New York Yankees team page at www.baseball-almanac.com

New York Yankees seasons
New York Yankees
New York Yankees
1960s in the Bronx
American League champion seasons